Klages's antbird (Drymophila klagesi) is a species of bird in the family Thamnophilidae. It is found in humid foothill forests (Serranía de Perijá to Venezuelan Coastal Range), especially in association with bamboo. This 15 cm (6 in) bird is found at higher elevations. It was previously considered conspecific with the long-tailed antbird.

References

 

Klages's antbird
Birds of the Venezuelan Andes
Birds of the Venezuelan Coastal Range
Klages's antbird